Jonathan Vergara Berrio (born 7 January 1999) is a Dutch professional footballer who plays as a midfielder for Derde Divisie club GVVV.

Career
Vergara Berrio signed his first professional contract with the club in July 2019 for two years with the option of a further year. He made his debut for the club on 28 February 2020 in a 5–1 victory over Jong AZ, with Vergara Berrio praised for his performance.

In November 2022, Vergara Berrio signed for Derde Divisie club GVVV on a contract until 2024.

References

External links
 
 

Living people
1999 births
People from Doetinchem
Association football midfielders
Association football wingers
Footballers from Gelderland
Dutch footballers
De Graafschap players
GVVV players
Eerste Divisie players